The Swelly Express is a mixtape by American band Chiddy Bang. It was released on October 29, 2009. It is the debut mixtape of the group, and it consists of 18 tracks: 12 songs, 5 skits, and 1 freestyle. Despite being Chiddy Bang's debut mixtape, it received surprisingly positive reviews from critics.

Track listing
 "Get Up in the Morning"
 "Never"
 "Danger Zone"
 "Fresh Like Us"
 "Now U Know" (featuring Jordan Brown)
 "Welcome to Major Label Inc" (skit)
 "Truth" (featuring Passion Pit)
 "Meet Mike Hoffman" (skit)
 "Pro’s Freestyle 1.0"
 "Awesome" (skit)
 "Dream Chasin’"
 "Silver Screen"
 "Slow Down" (featuring Black Thought & ELDee the Don)
 "Decline"
 "Call" (skit)
 "Opposite of Adults"
 "Voicemail" (skit)
 "All Things Go"

References

External links
 

Chiddy Bang albums
2009 mixtape albums
2009 EPs